Sergio Vergara (29 November 1927 – 15 December 2003) was a Chilean fencer. He competed in the individual épée event at the 1964 Summer Olympics.

References

External links
 

1927 births
2003 deaths
Chilean male épée fencers
Olympic fencers of Chile
Fencers at the 1964 Summer Olympics
Pan American Games medalists in fencing
Pan American Games silver medalists for Chile
Fencers at the 1963 Pan American Games
20th-century Chilean people
21st-century Chilean people